Meldungen aus Norwegen (Reports from Norway) is a series of reports on the situation in occupied Norway during World War II, by the Oslo department of the German Sicherheitspolizei (SiPo) and Sicherheitsdienst (SD). The reports were edited by Georg Wolff and sent to the Reich Security Main Office. They were distributed to German military leaders in Norway and Germany. They were typically structured with a section on the general situation, a section on the resistance movement, and other details.

References

Military publications
Norway in World War II